Thomas Paul Burgess is an academic, novelist and musician from Belfast, Northern Ireland.

Biography
Burgess attended Oxford University, studying Ethics & Moral Education, He obtained his PhD from University College Cork. He lives in Cork, Ireland, where he is a Senior Lecturer and Director of Youth & Community Work at The School of Applied Social Studies, University College Cork.

Publications
His published works include A Crisis of Conscience: - moral ambivalence and education in Northern Ireland (1993), The Reconciliation Industry: - community relations, community identity & social policy in Northern Ireland (2002), The Contested Identities of Ulster Protestants (2015) and The Contested Identities of Ulster Catholics (2018).

Novels 
His first novel, ‘White Church, Black Mountain’ (Matador. 2015) was short-listed for the Impress Prize for New Writers, 2017 and The Carousel Aware Prize for Best Novel, 2016.

His second novel, ‘Through Hollow Lands’ (Urbane 2018) is a dark supernatural thriller based loosely on Dante's ‘Inferno’ and follows survivors of the 9/11 attacks, through the seeming purgatory of Las Vegas. He has described it as, 'An allegorical tale on the death of American innocence.'

Music
As a songwriter with his band Ruefrex his work met with acclaim, the group being described as "...the most important band in Britain".

He appeared on the cover of Melody Maker after they had recorded the controversial "The Wild Colonial Boy" denouncing Irish-Americans for sending guns and money to the IRA. The record entered the UK top 30.
Their music was featured in the motion picture Good Vibrations.

His later projects include forming the musical collective Sacred Heart of Bontempi, and releasing a tribute to Pogues’ frontman, Shane MacGowan entitled, "Shane MacGowan’s Smile" (Burgess had previously toured with the band).

In 2021 Burgess wrote, performed and produced ‘Vanished into Air; a song for the disappeared’. The project was intended to highlight the plight of those families who lost members believed to have been abducted, murdered and secretly buried in Northern Ireland, the large majority of which occurred during the Troubles. The victim support group Wave and family members supported the initiative.

Discography

Albums 

Flowers for all Occasions (8 versions), Kasper Records, 1985

Singles & EPs 

One by One (5 versions), Good Vibrations Records
Capital Letters (7"), Kabuki Records
Paid in Kind (2 versions), One by One
The Wild Colonial Boy (4 versions), Kasper Records
In the Traps (2 versions), Kasper Records
Political Wings (12"), Flicknife Records
Shane MacGowan’s Smile, Espresso Records

Compilations 

Capital Letters... The Best of..., (CD, Comp), Cherry Red

References

1959 births
Living people
Academics of University College Cork
Alumni of Ulster University
Alumni of the University of Oxford
Alumni of University College Cork
Academics from Northern Ireland
Male musicians from Northern Ireland
Male novelists from Northern Ireland
Songwriters from Northern Ireland